Humibacter aquilariae is a Gram-positive and aerobic bacterium from the genus Humibacter which has been isolated from an agarwood chip.

References

External links
Type strain of Humibacter aquilariae at BacDive -  the Bacterial Diversity Metadatabase

Microbacteriaceae
Bacteria described in 2017